Khanith (also spelled Khaneeth or Xanith) denotes a person assigned male at birth who uses feminine gender expression, including trans women, men who have sex with men, cisgender or Boudi men perceived as feminine. It is generally considered derogatory and misleading, but some individuals have sought to reclaim it as a mark of pride.

The term is used in Oman and parts of the Arabian Peninsula and is closely related to "mukhannathun" , meaning "effeminate".

See also
Khawal
LGBT in the Middle East
List of transgender-related topics
List of LGBT slang terms

Bibliography

References

Gender systems
Third gender
Transgender in the Middle East
Arabic words and phrases
Gender in Oman
LGBT in the Arab world
LGBT in the Middle East
LGBT-related slurs